In investing, downside beta is the beta that measures a stock's association with the overall stock market (risk) only on days when the market’s return is negative. Downside beta was first proposed by Roy 1952 and then popularized in an investment book by Markowitz (1959).

Formula

while upside beta is given by this expression with the direction of the inequalities reversed. Therefore,  can be estimated with a regression of the excess return of security  on the excess return of the market, conditional on (excess) market return being negative.

Downside beta vs. beta
Downside beta was once hypothesized to have greater explanatory power than standard beta in bearish markets. As such, it would have been a better measure of risk than ordinary beta.

Use in Equilibrium Models of Risk-Reward 
The Capital asset pricing model (CAPM) can be modified to work with dual betas. Other researchers have attempted to use semi-variance instead of standard deviation to measure risk.

References

External links
An Investigation of Beta and Downside Beta Based CAPM - Case Study of Karachi Stock Exchange, SSRN. M. Tahir, Q. Abbas, S.M. Sargana, U. Ayub and S.K. Saeed; February 2013

Financial risk modeling
Finance theories